The Holzbach is a stream in the state of Saarland, Germany, in the uplands of the Schwarzwälder Hochwald. It flows into the Losheimer Bach at Nunkirchen.

Geography

Course 

Tributaries 
 Flachsbach (left)
 Schlittentaler Bach (left)
 Ruwerbach (right)

Settlements 
The Holzbach flows through the following settlements:
 Weiskirchen
 Konfeld
 Thailen
 Batschweiler
 Weierweiler
 Münchweiler
 Nunkirchen

See also
List of rivers of Saarland

References 

Rivers of Saarland
Rivers of Germany